The 1970 Big League World Series took place from August 17–22 in Fort Lauderdale, Florida, United States. Lincolnwood, Illinois defeated San Fernando/Simi Valley, California twice in the championship game. This was the first BLWS held in Fort Lauderdale.

This year marked the first appearance for the European, and Latin American regions.

Teams

Results

References

Big League World Series
Big League World Series